Barkatullah Khan (25 October 1920  – 11 October 1973) was a politician from Indian state of Rajasthan and a leader of Indian National Congress party. He was elected to the state assembly from Tijara in 1972

He was Chief Minister of Rajasthan from 9 July 1971 to 11 October 1973, when he died in office.

External links

References 

1920 births
1973 deaths
Chief Ministers of Rajasthan
20th-century Indian Muslims
People from Jodhpur
Chief ministers from Indian National Congress
Indian National Congress politicians
Members of the Rajasthan Legislative Assembly
Rajya Sabha members from Rajasthan
Indian National Congress politicians from Rajasthan